Johnny Hawksworth (2 February 1924 – 13 February 2009) was a British bass player and composer who lived and worked in Australia beginning in 1984.

Biography
Born in London in 1924, Hawksworth initially trained as a pianist, but also played double bass for Britain's leading big band the Ted Heath Orchestra during the early 1950s and through the 1960s. During this time he became one of the most popular jazz bassists in the UK, winning many polls and was often featured as a soloist on Heath concerts and recordings. He is probably best known, however, for his short compositions for television. These include Salute to Thames (the famous identity tune for Thames Television) and also the theme tunes for the 1960s pop music show Thank Your Lucky Stars and the 1970s series Roobarb, Man About the House and George and Mildred. He also contributed some of the incidental music used in the 1967 Spider-Man cartoon (although originating from the United States, produced in Canada, Spider-Man had most of its incidental music supplied by Irish composers, such as Phil Coulter, who was from Derry in Northern Ireland, and British including Syd Dale, Alan Hawkshaw, David Lindup, Bill Martin and Johnny Pearson.) In addition to his television themes, he also worked on films, including the scores to The Naked World of Harrison Marks (1967), The Penthouse (1967), and Zeta One (1970).

"Er Indoors", one of his compositions, saw frequent use in the Nickelodeon TV Series SpongeBob SquarePants, in which it was generally associated with avid SpongeBob fan Patchy the Pirate.

Hawksworth has also written many pieces of stock music for the De Wolfe Music library. He also provided the hypnotic musical soundtrack to Geoffrey Jones's classic British Transport Films Snow (1963) and has composed American-style blues-based material under the name Bunny J. Browne and classically-based material under the name John Steinway.  Hawksworth moved to Australia in 1984 and died in Sydney in 2009 aged 85.

References

External links

1924 births
2009 deaths
British bass guitarists
Male bass guitarists
British composers
British expatriates in Australia
20th-century bass guitarists
20th-century British male musicians
Jingle composers